Price gouging is the practice of increasing the prices of goods, services, or commodities to a level much higher than is considered reasonable or fair. Usually, this event occurs after a demand or supply shock. This commonly applies to price increases of basic necessities after natural disasters. In legal usage, price gouging is a crime that applies in some jurisdictions of the United States during civil emergencies. In less precise usage, the term can also be used to refer to profits obtained by practices inconsistent with a competitive free market, or to windfall profits. Price gouging is considered by some to be exploitative and unethical. 

Price gouging is similar to profiteering but can be distinguished by being short-term and localized and by being restricted to essentials such as food, clothing, shelter, medicine, and equipment needed to preserve life and property. In jurisdictions where there is no such crime, the term may still be used to pressure firms to refrain from such behavior. The term is used directly in laws and regulations in the United States and Canada, but legislation exists internationally with similar regulatory purpose under existing competition laws.

The term is not in widespread use in mainstream economic theory, but it is sometimes used to refer to practices of a coercive monopoly that raises prices above the market rate that would otherwise prevail in a competitive environment. Alternatively, it may refer to suppliers' benefiting to excess from a short-term change in the demand curve.

Price gouging became highly prevalent in news media in the wake of the COVID-19 pandemic, when state price gouging regulations went into effect due to the national emergency. The rise in public discourse was associated with increased shortages related to the COVID-19 pandemic.

Laws against price gouging

United States 
In the United States, state laws against price gouging have been held as constitutional at the state level as a valid exercise of the police power to preserve order during an emergency, and may be combined with anti-hoarding measures.

As of March 2021, 42 states have emergency regulations or price-gouging statutes Price-gouging is often defined in terms of the three criteria listed below:

 Period of emergency: The majority of laws apply only to price shifts during a declared state of emergency or disaster.
 Necessary items: Most laws apply exclusively to items essential to survival, such as food, water, and housing.
 Price ceilings: Laws limit the maximum price that can be charged for given goods.

Some states that do not have a specific statute addressing price gouging, can nevertheless apply the law as an "unfair" or "deceptive practice" under a consumer protection act.

When the law goes into effect 
Statutory prohibitions on price gouging become effective once a state of emergency has been declared. States have legislated different requirements for who must declare a state of emergency for the law to go into effect. Some state statutes that prohibit price gouging—including those of Alabama, Florida, Mississippi, and Ohio—prohibit price increases only once the President of the United States or the state's governor has declared a state of emergency in the impacted region. California permits emergency proclamations by officials, boards, and other governing bodies of cities and counties to trigger the state's price gouging law.

What the law prohibits 
State laws vary on what price increases are permitted during a declared disaster. California has set a 10 percent ceiling on price increases. Florida prohibits a price increase “that grossly exceeds the average price” of that same item in the 30 days leading up to the emergency declaration. Some state laws do not define what constitutes a “gross disparity,” making it difficult for either affected residents or law enforcement to determine when price gouging has occurred, while others merely limit vendors and landlords to price increases of less than 25 percent. Laws often include exceptions for price increases that can be justified in terms of the increased cost of supply, transportation, demand, or storage.

Enforcement 
Enforcement of anti-price gouging statutes can be difficult because of the exceptions often contained within the statutes and the lack of oversight mechanisms. Statutes generally give wide discretion not to prosecute. In 2004, Florida determined that one-third of complaints were unfounded, and a large fraction of the remainder was handled by consent decrees, rather than prosecution.

California 
California Penal Code 396 prohibits price gouging, generally defined as anything greater than a 10 percent increase in price, once a state of emergency has been declared.  Unlike other states that require the President of the United States or the state's governor to declare a state of emergency, California permits emergency proclamations by officials, boards, and other governing bodies of cities and counties to trigger C.P.C. § 396.  The prohibition lasts for up to 30 days at a time and may be renewed as necessary.  Since October 2017, then-California Governor Jerry Brown repeatedly extended the price-gouging ban for counties impacted by the October 2017 wildfires and subsequently for the counties impacted by the 2018 wildfires.  One of his last acts as governor was to extend the prohibitions until May 31, 2019.

Even though California prohibits price hikes after an emergency is declared, the state, like many others, has virtually no price monitoring structure for oversight. Attorneys and law enforcement generally rely on news reports and word of mouth to learn about price increases that may violate the law. The District Attorney of Sonoma County has attempted to remedy this by creating its own task force focused on combatting and prosecuting price gouging.

In 2018, the California state legislature amended C.P.C. § 396 after the fallout from the 2017 wildfires.  District attorneys reached out to legislators explaining how the current language of section 396 made it difficult to enforce. By the time the 2017 fires had been extinguished, the median rent had increased by more than 35 percent and the rental vacancy rate was zero. News reports detailed renters being forced out of their homes to make way for those who could afford to pay more, either with their own money or their insurance company's.

The legislature completely rewrote sections 396(e)-(f).  Prior to the revisions, those sections of the law had only specified that the prohibitions on price gouging could be extended for additional 30-day periods and that a violation of the law was punishable by imprisonment in a county jail no longer than one year, by a fine no greater than $10,000 dollars, or both.

The amended version went into effect on January 1, 2019 and aimed to reduce future price increases similar to those that had ensued after the October 2017 fires.  Section 396(e) stipulated, in part, that: “it is unlawful for any person, business, or other entity, to increase the rental price . . . advertised, offered, or charged for housing, to an existing or prospective tenant, by more than 10 percent.”  While the amendment reiterated that landlords may increase the rental price by up to 10 percent if they could demonstrate that the increase in costs were directly attributable to repairs, it also clarified what could not justify an increase in rent.

An increase in rent may not be “based on the length of the rental term, the inclusion of additional goods or services, except with respect to furniture, or that the rent was offered by, or paid by, an insurance company, or other third party, on behalf of a tenant."

Florida

Florida's "state of emergency" law criminalizes price gouging. A supplier of essential goods and services may be charged when it sharply raises prices in anticipation of or during a civil emergency or when it cancels or dishonors contracts in order to take advantage of an increase in prices related to such an emergency. The model case is a retailer who increases the price of existing stocks of milk and bread when a hurricane is imminent. Though the effect of such laws have been proven to actually increase the risk of extreme shortages since the absence of increased prices replaces higher prices with an incentive for the earliest person to market to obtain all of a product about to imminently experience a period of very high demand.

In Florida, it is a defense to show that the price increase mostly reflects increased costs, such as running an emergency generator or hazard pay for workers, while California places a ten percent cap on any increases.

United Kingdom 
Laws and regulations in the United Kingdom do not use the phrase “price gouging” in consumer protection regulation but are similar to U.S. laws. Chapter II of the UK Competition Act 1998 prohibits businesses with market dominance from engaging in "abusive" conduct, including "unfair" pricing. Market dominance is considered when a business has greater than 40% of the market share within their respective industry. In the case of a violation of Chapter II, a business can be forced to pay up to 10% of global revenues.

European Union 
Similar to UK regulations, the EU does not include “price gouging” explicitly in regulation. Article 102 of the Treaty on the Functioning of the European Union is "aimed at preventing undertakings who hold a dominant position in a market from abusing that position." As stated, “such abuse may, in particular, consist in: (a) directly or indirectly imposing unfair purchase or selling prices or other unfair trading conditions...” In 2016, the EU Commissioner for Competition Margrethe Vestager stated that the EU Commission will "intervene directly to correct excessively high prices" specifically within the gas industry, pharmaceutical industry and in cases of abuse of standard-essential patents.

Price gouging and COVID-19 

On March 13, 2020, a national emergency was declared in the United States by President Trump in response to the outbreak of the COVID-19 pandemic; the declaration allowed for an initial $50 billion to be used to support states. As studied by the National Institutes of Health, the COVID-19 pandemic induced a panic as mandates were put in place for Americans to stay at home, quarantine, and wear masks. The declared COVID-19 emergency made state-level price gouging laws and regulations go into effect. Demand for certain products increased while supply decreased. Such products in short supply included surgical facial masks, N-95 facial masks, hand sanitizer, and toilet paper. More than 30 states' attorneys general urged Facebook, Amazon, Craigslist, eBay, and Walmart to restrict the selling of necessary products at "unconscionable" prices.

Online price gouging 

E-commerce transactions accounted for 14.4% of US retail sales in 2020. The share of e-commerce transactions is expected to continue increasing yearly. E-commerce sellers and consumers in the US are often located in separate states. Concerns relating to the dormant commerce clause in the U.S. Constitution arise in litigation wherein the e-commerce seller is located in a different state than the plaintiff. The dormant commerce clause is the doctrine against extraterritoriality that prohibits states from passing legislation that "excessively burdens interstate commerce." Therefore, states should not regulate commerce taking place outside of state borders. Large e-commerce retail platforms, including Amazon and Walmart, do not require sellers and consumers to be located in the same state for transactions to occur. Questions regarding accountability and enforceability of price gouging regulations in relation to e-commerce transactions have been litigated.

Online Merchants Guild v. Cameron, 2020 
This complaint relates to online merchants selling necessary products on Amazon during the US national state of emergency invoked in response to the COVID-19 pandemic. Amazon is a leading e-commerce platform that has seen an increase of market capitalization of more than $570 billion throughout the pandemic. The Online Merchants Guild, a trade association for online merchants, filed a case in Kentucky on the basis that state regulations against price gouging are unconstitutional in the online marketplace since online merchants are unable to control pricing by state. The U.S. District Court for the Eastern District of Kentucky sided with the Online Merchants Guild on June 23, 2020, and agreed that the Kentucky Attorney General cannot enforce the price gouging regulations on Amazon sellers. The case is set to be reviewed by the Sixth Circuit Court of Appeals.

Price gouging-related lawsuits during the COVID-19 pandemic 

In response to the issuance of emergency price gouging regulations, multiple state attorneys general and federal agencies have investigated potential cases of price gouging impacting consumers and agencies. Since regulatory measures vary by state, there is no uniform interpretation of price gouging violations, and it is left to state courts to decide.

People of the State of New York v. Hillandale Farms Corporation, 2020 

On August 11, 2020, New York Attorney General Letitia James sued Hillandale Farms, one of the largest U.S. egg producers, for allegedly price gouging more than four million cartons of eggs by increasing prices by almost five times during the pandemic. The lawsuit alleges that the price increases were an effort to profit off of higher consumer demand during the pandemic. To settle the lawsuit, Hillandale Farms agreed to donate 1.2 million eggs to New York food banks. The case was dismissed with prejudice. This suit was one of several against egg producers during the pandemic, with the Texas Attorney General suing Cal-Maine Foods, the California Attorney General suing Dakota Layers, and the West Virginia Attorney General suing Dutt & Wagner.

Southern District of Mississippi, 2021 

A Mississippi businessman purchased scarce personal protective equipment (PPE) including gowns, face shields, and masks through his pharmaceutical wholesale company. An indictment alleges that the business then solicited health care providers, including the U.S. Veteran's Association, to purchase the PPE at excessively inflated prices as part of a $1.8 million scheme. This case was investigated by the FBI, Veteran's Association, and Fraud Section of the United States Department of Justice. The charges brought were conspiracy to commit wire fraud and mail fraud, conspiracy to defraud the United States, conspiracy to commit hoarding of designated scarce materials, and hoarding of designated scarce materials.

Opposition to laws against price gouging
In a 2012 survey of leading American economists by the Initiative on Global Markets, only 8 percent agreed with a proposal to prohibit "unconscionably excessive" price gouging during natural disasters in Connecticut; 51 percent disagreed with the proposal, 15 percent were uncertain, and 8 percent had no opinion. The economists opposing the proposal argued that such legislation would lead to a misallocation of resources and to lower supply and greater scarcity of the resources, or that the proposal in question was vague.

According to the theory of neoclassical economics, anti-price gouging laws prevent allocative efficiency. Allocative efficiency holds that when prices function properly, markets tend to allocate resources to their most valued uses. In turn, those who value the good the most and are able to afford it will pay a higher price than those who do not value the good as much or who are unable to afford it. According to Friedrich Hayek in "The Use of Knowledge in Society", prices can act to coordinate the separate actions of different people as they seek to satisfy their desires. Economists such as Thomas Sowell (Chicago School of economics), Donald J. Boudreaux (Austrian School and public choice), and Raymond Niles (Senior Fellow at the American Institute for Economic Research) argue that laws prohibiting price gouging dramatically worsen emergencies for both buyers and sellers.

See also
 Extortion
 Hoarding (economics)
 Just price
 Monopoly
 Price fixing
 Sherman Antitrust Act
 Ticket resale
 Unintended consequences

References

External links

 Florida Attorney General FAQ Concerning Price Gouging
 Condemning Price Gouging with Respect to Motor Fuels Following Terrorist Acts of September 11, 2001 in the Congressional Record

Pricing
Commercial crimes